Staphylus is a genus of skippers in the family Hesperiidae found mainly in South America with some species in the Caribbean, Mexico, Central America, and southern United States.

Species
Listed alphabetically.
Staphylus ascalaphus (Staudinger, 1876) – mauve scallopwing
Staphylus ascalon (Staudinger, 1876)
Staphylus astra (Williams & Bell, 1940)
Staphylus azteca (Scudder, 1872) – Aztec scallopwing
Staphylus balsa (Bell, 1937)
Staphylus buena (Williams & Bell, 1940)
Staphylus caribbea (Williams & Bell, 1940)
Staphylus cartagoa (Williams & Bell, 1940)
Staphylus ceos (Edwards, 1882) – golden-headed sootywing
Staphylus chlora Evans, 1953 – green-headed sootywing
Staphylus chlorocephala (Latreille, [1824])
Staphylus corumba (Williams & Bell, 1940)
Staphylus eryx Evans, 1953
Staphylus esmeraldus Miller, 1966
Staphylus evemerus Godman & Salvin, [1896]
Staphylus hayhurstii (Edwards, 1870) – Hayhurst's scallopwing, scalloped sootywing
Staphylus huigra (Williams & Bell, 1940)
Staphylus iguala (Williams & Bell, 1940) – Iguala sootywing
Staphylus imperspicua (Hayward, 1940)
Staphylus incanus Bell, 1932
Staphylus insignis Mielke, 1980
Staphylus kayei Cock, 1996
Staphylus lenis Steinhauser, 1989
Staphylus lizeri (Hayward, 1938)
Staphylus mazans (Reakirt, [1867]) – Mazans scallopwing, southern scalloped sootywing
Staphylus melaina (Hayward, 1947)
Staphylus melangon (Mabille, 1883)
Staphylus melius Steinhauser, 1989
Staphylus musculus (Burmeister, 1875)
Staphylus oeta (Plötz, 1884) – Plötz's sootywing
Staphylus parvus Steinhauser & Austin, 1993
Staphylus perforata (Möschler, 1879)
Staphylus perna Evans, 1953
Staphylus punctiseparatus Hayward, 1933
Staphylus putumayo (Bell, 1937)
Staphylus sambo Evans, 1953
Staphylus saxos Evans, 1953
Staphylus shola Evans, 1953
Staphylus tepeca (Bell, 1942) – checkered scallopwing
Staphylus tierra Evans, 1953 – west-Mexican scallopwing
Staphylus tingo Steinhauser, 1989
Staphylus tridentis Steinhauser, 1989
Staphylus tucumanus (Plötz, 1884)
Staphylus tyro (Mabille, 1878)
Staphylus unicornis Steinhauser & Austin, 1993
Staphylus veytius Freeman, 1969 – Chiapas scallopwing
Staphylus vincula (Plötz, 1886) – mountain scallopwing
Staphylus vulgata (Möschler, 1879) – golden-snouted scallopwing

Former species
Staphylus angulata (Bell, 1937) - transferred to Incisus angulata (Bell, 1937)
Staphylus fasciatus Hayward, 1933 - transferred to Incisus fasciatus (Hayward, 1933)
Staphylus incisus (Mabille, 1878) - transferred to Incisus incisus (Mabille, 1878)

References

 
Butterfly genera
Taxa named by Frederick DuCane Godman
Taxa named by Osbert Salvin